Music in High Places is a live album by the San Diego-based rock band Unwritten Law, released in 2003 by Earth Escapes. It was recorded live for the VH1 program Music in High Places and features the band performing acoustic renditions of their songs in various natural settings in  Yellowstone National Park (with the exception of "Shallow," which was recorded acoustically in the studio). The version of "Rest of My Life" from this recording was released as a music video and reached #16 on US modern rock charts. The album peaked at #134 on the Billboard 200.

Most of the songs performed are from the band's preceding 2 albums, 1998's Unwritten Law and 2002's Elva. It would be the band's final recording with founding drummer Wade Youman, who was ejected from the band shortly after, due to personal and professional issues, until he was reinstated in 2013 though he eventually quit the band again in 2019.

Track listing

Personnel

Band
Scott Russo - lead vocals
Steve Morris - lead guitar, backing vocals
Rob Brewer - rhythm guitar, backing vocals
Pat "PK" Kim - bass guitar
Wade Youman - drums

Production
Don Worsham and Wil Burston – recording engineers
John Alagia and Jeff Juliano – mixing
Peter Harding – additional engineering and editing
Baraka – Pro Tools

Artwork
Jeff Nicholas and Marco Orozco – cover design and art direction
Spencer Thornton and Steve Simmons – photography

Chart positions
Singles - Billboard (North America)

Unwritten Law albums
2003 live albums